Thomas Alfred John Playfair  (13 October 1890 – 9 August 1966) was an Australian politician, military officer and meat exporter.

Early life
Known throughout his life as "Jack", Playfair was born at Millers Point to shipping providore and meat exporter Edmund John Playfair and Edith Creer. His grandfather John Thomas Playfair had founded a successful wholesale meat business in The Rocks, Sydney provisioning Sydney's shipping trade. Jack  Playfair attended Sydney Church of England Grammar School and learned the meat trade at the Smithfield Meat Market in London in 1906 before returning to the family business in Sydney - Thomas Playfair Ltd.

Military career
In 1910 Playfair enlisted as a gunner in the Australian Field Artillery (New South Wales). He was promoted to lieutenant in 1913.

From 1914 to 1919 Playfair served in the AIF. He was first with the 1st Field Artillery at Gallipoli, where he was seriously wounded, and then served in the 7th Field Artillery in France. He was mentioned in dispatches five times, awarded the Distinguished Service Order and the Volunteer Officers' Decoration, and achieved the rank of Brigade Major. On his return he was appointed an Officer of the Order of the British Empire.

He transferred to the reserve in 1942. In World War II he commanded the 2nd Division's Artillery unit, and was promoted to brigadier.

Business and politics
From 1914 to 1915 he was an alderman on Waverley Council. From 1927 to 1966 he was a member of the New South Wales Legislative Council, representing successively the Nationalist Party, the United Australia Party and the Liberal Party.

By 1926 he was chairman of directors of the firm founded by his grandfather. He modernised the plant and added a smallgoods factory which enabled the firm during World War II to become the largest supplier of canned sausages to the AIF and to the US forces in the Pacific.

Personal
On 29 August 1918 he married Madge Hardy in London; they had four children. He died at Darlinghurst in 1966.

References

1890 births
1966 deaths
Nationalist Party of Australia members of the Parliament of New South Wales
United Australia Party members of the Parliament of New South Wales
Liberal Party of Australia members of the Parliament of New South Wales
Members of the New South Wales Legislative Council
Australian Companions of the Distinguished Service Order
Officers of the Order of the British Empire
20th-century Australian politicians